John Garton was the member of Parliament for the constituency of Dover for the parliaments of May 1413, November 1414, and 1425.

References 

Members of the Parliament of England for Dover
English MPs May 1413
Year of birth unknown
Year of death unknown
English MPs November 1414
English MPs 1425